Robert Moffat may refer to:

 Robert Moffat (missionary) (1795–1883), Scottish Congregationalist missionary to Africa, and father in law of David Livingstone
 Robert Moffat (businessman) (born 1956), senior executive at IBM
 Robert Moffat (politician) (1844–1887), New Brunswick businessman and political figure

See also
 Robert Moffit (fl. 1960s–2000s), Director of the Center for Health Policy Studies at the Heritage Foundation